The Sports Institute for Northern Ireland, shortened to SINI, is a partnership between Ulster University and Sport Northern Ireland. The institute was established in 2002 and provides facilities and specialist services for up to 120 sportsmen and women with the aim of improving their "competitive capacity within the sporting arena". The Institute is currently based at Jordanstown Campus, however limited services are available at the Coleraine campus.

Four Performance Development Centres (PDCs), based in Bangor, Belfast, Cookstown and Lisburn, offer specific services to their localities. SINI is intended to develop and maintain Olympic standard support to Northern Ireland's top athletes and coaches. The facilities cater for Olympic, Paralympic and Commonwealth Games athletes and sports along with a select number of sports that are important to the public in Northern Ireland including rugby, soccer, cricket, GAA, golf and motor sports. Staff work in sport-led programmes in both an inter–disciplinary and multi-disciplinary fashion.

Services
The Institute offers Performance Planning, Sport Medicine, Physiotherapy and Soft Tissue Therapy, Strength and Conditioning Training, Performance Nutrition, Physiology and Performance Analysis, Talent Identification, Performance Psychology Services and Performance Lifestyle Advice.

Partners
The Institute is currently partnered with most Irish and Northern Irish Sports bodies. If a sporting body wishes for an athlete to compete at an international level they may apply to the Institute for that sports-person to receive their services. The selection process prohibits athletes which have not been nominated by their sporting body from becoming a member. SINI is currently partners with:

Publicly Funded Bodies
 Department for Culture, Media and Sport (DCMS)
 Sport Northern Ireland

Sporting Bodies
 British Olympic Association
 Great Britain Paralympic Association
 Irish Olympic Council
 Paralympics Ireland
 Institute_Of_Sport/Irish Institute of Sport
 Welsh Institute of Sport
 English Institute of Sport
 Scottish Institute of Sport
 Commonwealth Games Council Northern Ireland

Sports Councils
 Sport Northern Ireland
 Sport Scotland
 Sport England
 UK Sport
 Sport Wales
 Irish Sports Council

Preferred Partnership Programme
 Dartfish
 For GoodnessShakes
 Optimum Nutrition
 Healthspan Elite

References

External links
 Official Website
 SportNI
 Jordanstown Campus Webpage

Sport at Ulster University
Sports medicine in the United Kingdom
Sports organisations of Northern Ireland